Alina Armas (born 10 September 1983) is a Namibian long distance runner who specialises in the marathon. She competed in the women's marathon event at the 2016 Summer Olympics.

References

External links
 
 

1983 births
Living people
Namibian female long-distance runners
Namibian female marathon runners
Athletes (track and field) at the 2016 Summer Olympics
Olympic athletes of Namibia
People from Oshana Region
20th-century Namibian women
21st-century Namibian women